Owen Tromans is a British musician and writer. He played with the group San Lorenzo and now records under his own name. Tromans has recorded several albums and two EPs since 2001.

Tromans plays in the improv guitar duo Delphic Vapours with author and musician Seb Hunter, and has collaborated with Savaging Spires to release music under the name Candles.

Discography
Box of Tapes (Sacred Geometry, 2001)
From a Lost Library (Sacred Geometry, 2003)
Place (Bearos, 2004)
Hope Is a Magnet (Sacred Geometry, 2008)
The Fall of Acre (Sacred Geometry, 2009)
Eternal Western Youthdream: 2001–2011 (Critical Heights, 2011)
Golden Margins (Sacred Geometry, 2014)
Between Stones (Sacred Geometry, 2019)

Tromans contributed to an album of James Joyce poetry set to music entitled Chamber Music which was released on Fire Records in 2008.

He contributed to the sixth issue of Esopus Magazine's CD Series.

In April 2011, Tromans released a split single with Wooden Wand on the English label Critical Heights.

References

External links 

1978 births
Living people
British male singer-songwriters
British pop singers
British male guitarists